Bowling at the 2007 Southeast Asian Games was held at the SF Strike Bowl in Bangkok, Thailand. The bowling schedule began on December 8 to December 14.

Medal tally

Medalists

Men

Women

Mixed

External links
Southeast Asian Games Official Results

2007 Southeast Asian Games events
Southeast Asian Games
2007